Richard Foster (born 1945) is a British painter, principally of portraits.

Life
Foster was born in East Lexham, Norfolk and educated at Harrow School and Trinity College, Oxford with further artistic training at Studio Simi, Florence and the City and Guilds of London Institute.

Foster has been a member of the Royal Society of Portrait Painters since 1976 and President since 2017. Furthermore, he served as Vice-President from 1991 to 1994 and Treasurer from 2003 to 2006. Foster has also acted as a member of the Art Workers Guild since 1980.

Over his career, he has tried to be as diverse as possible and has painted a great variety of pictures in both oil and watercolour, not just single portraits and groups, but also landscapes and compositions which he exhibits  at his one-man shows every three or four years .

List of works
 Portrait of Ed Coode- Girton College, Cambridge, Cambridgeshire
 Portrait of Francis Curzon, 3rd Viscount- Kedleston Hall, Kedleston, Derbyshire
 Portrait of Sir Douglas Ranger- UCL Art Museum, Bloomsbury, Greater London
 Portrait of Michael Checkland- Broadcasting House, Marylebone, Greater London
 Portrait of Sir Edmund Compton- Royal Academy of Music, Regent's Park, Greater London
 Portrait of Sir Douglas Black- Royal College of Physicians, Regent's Park, Greater London
 Portrait of Maj-Gen. Sir George Burns- County Hall, Hertford, Hertfordshire
 Portrait of Robert Hume- Royal College of Physicians and Surgeons of Glasgow, Glasgow, Lanarkshire
 Portrait of Diana, Princess of Wales- Royal College of Physicians and Surgeons of Glasgow, Glasgow, Lanarkshire
 The Nativity, Saint Andrew the Fisherman and The Second Coming- St. Andrew's Church, East Lexham, Norfolk
 Portrait of Dr Vivian H. H. Green- Lincoln College, Oxford, Oxfordshire
 Portrait of Burke St. John Trend- Lincoln College, Oxford, Oxfordshire
 Portrait of Lt. Oswald Phipps, 4th Marquess- Green Howards Regimental Museum, Richmond, North Yorkshire

References

External links 
 
 The Royal Society of Portrait Painters - Richard Foster

1945 births
20th-century English painters
English male painters
21st-century English painters
21st-century English male artists
English portrait painters
Living people
People educated at Harrow School
Alumni of Trinity College, Oxford
20th-century English male artists